Nationality words link to articles with information on the nation's poetry or literature (for instance, Irish or France).

Events
 January–September – Samuel Taylor Coleridge serves as Acting Public Secretary in Malta.
 William Wordsworth begins his first revision of The Prelude: or, Growth of a Poet's Mind in 13 Books, a version completed in 1806 and further revised later in his life. His work this year and next revised the original 1798-1799 version. The book was not published in any form until shortly after his death in 1850.

Works published

United Kingdom
 Robert Anderson, Ballads in the Cumberland Dialect
 Henry Cary, translator, The Inferno of Dante Alighieri, parallel text
 Charlotte Dacre, Hours of Solitude
 George Ellis, editor, Specimens of Early English Metrical Romances (anthology)
 William Hayley, Ballads
 Charles Lamb, The King and Queen of Hearts, published anonymously; for children
 Sir Walter Scott, The Lay of the Last Minstrel
 Robert Southey, Madoc
 William Taylor, translation from the original German by G. E. Lessing, Nathan the Wise, first privately printed in 1791
 John Thelwall, The Trident of Albion, on the Battle of Trafalgar
 Mary Tighe, Psyche, or the Legend of Love
 William Wordsworth and Samuel Taylor Coleridge, Lyrical Ballads, with Pastoral and Other Poems, the last separate edition, with some variants in the poems; previous editions in 1798, 1801, 1802
 The Comic Adventures of Old Mother Hubbard and her Dog

United States
 Thomas Green Fessenden, Democracy Unveiled
 John Blair Linn, Valerian, A Narrative Poem: Intended, in Part, to Describe the Early Persecutions of Christians, and Rapidly to Illustrate the Influence of Christianity on the Manners of Nations, By John Blair Linn ... With a Sketch of the Life and Character of the Author, Philadelphia: Thomas and George Palmer
 Alexander Wilson, The Foresters

Other
 Adam Oehlenschlager, Poetiske Skrifter ("Poetic Writings"), prose and poetry, narrative cycles, drama, lyrics, ballads and romances, including "Aladdin", a philosophical fairy-tale drama in blank verse; Denmark
 Achim von Arnim and Clemens Brentano, edited and composed, Des Knaben Wunderhorn, vol. 1; Germany

Births
Death years link to the corresponding "[year] in poetry" article:
 February 22 – Sarah Fuller Adams (died 1848), English
 March 20 – Thomas Cooper (died 1892), English Chartist, poet and religious lecturer
 May 26 – Joseph Grant (died 1835), Scottish

Deaths
Birth years link to the corresponding "[year] in poetry" article:
 January 5 – Gottlob Burmann (born 1737), German poet and lipogrammatist
 May 9 – Friedrich Schiller (born 1759), German poet and dramatist
 August 3 – Christopher Anstey (born 1724) English writer and poet

See also

 Poetry
 List of years in poetry
 List of years in literature
 19th century in literature
 19th century in poetry
 Romantic poetry
 Golden Age of Russian Poetry (1800–1850)
 Weimar Classicism period in Germany, commonly considered to have begun in 1788  and to have ended either in 1805, with the death of Friedrich Schiller, or 1832, with the death of Goethe
 List of poets

Notes

 "A Timeline of English Poetry" Web page of the Representative Poetry Online Web site, University of Toronto

19th-century poetry
Poetry